Mangai Oru Gangai is a 1987 Indian Tamil-language legal drama film directed by T. Hariharan and produced by Kovaithambi. The film stars Saritha and Nadhiya. It was released on 24 July 1987.

Plot 

Radha Ranganathan, an advocate, becomes cynical after failing to get a criminal convicted for the murder of her brother-in-law.

Cast 
 Saritha as Radha Ranganathan
 Nadhiya as Radha's protege Nancy Narayanaswamy
 Charan Raj
 Poornam Viswanathan
 Suresh
 Sivachandran
 Kamala Kamesh

Production 
Mangai Oru Gangai was directed by T. Hariharan and produced by Kovaithambi of Motherland Pictures. Hariharan also wrote the screenplay, based on a story by Motherland Pictures' Story Department, and the dialogue was written by M. G. Vallabhan. Cinematography was handled by U. Rajagopal, and editing by M. S. Money.

Soundtrack 
The soundtrack was composed by the duo Laxmikant–Pyarelal.

Release and reception 
Mangai Oru Gangai was released on 24 July 1987. On 7 August, N. Krishnaswamy of The Indian Express wrote, "I was pleased that the makers of the film had done their homework on the script and had here something that was intellectually simulating", and praised the performances of Saritha, Charan Raj, Nadhiya and Viswanathan.

References

External links 
 

1980s legal drama films
1980s Tamil-language films
Films directed by Hariharan
Films scored by Laxmikant–Pyarelal
Indian legal drama films